Daniel Stevenson Foster (born January 31, 1948) was a Democratic member of the West Virginia Senate, representing the 17th District from 2004 through 2012. He was previously a member of the West Virginia House of Delegates from 2002 through 2004.

External links
West Virginia Legislature - Senator Dan Foster official government website
Project Vote Smart - Senator Daniel S. Foster (WV) profile
Follow the Money - Dan Foster
2008 2006 2004 2002 Senate campaign contributions

Democratic Party West Virginia state senators
Democratic Party members of the West Virginia House of Delegates
Harvard University alumni
Stanford University School of Medicine alumni
1948 births
Living people
Physicians from West Virginia
American surgeons
People from Oak Ridge, Tennessee
Politicians from Charleston, West Virginia
21st-century American politicians